= Malcolm Starr =

Malcolm Starr (1924–2008) was an American fashion manufacturer and businessman. He ran an eponymous high-end ready-to-wear label based in New York City.
